Bingo Durango was an eighties alternative pop/rock group that drew heavily on the sound of sixties psychedelia.  The band's releases were characterized by layered arrangements, dreamy melodies, and the fluid guitar of Scott Mather.

Origins 

Bingo Durango crystallized around a guitar driven, New York quintet in the mid-eighties.  The band came to the attention of ex-Roxy Music bassist and Smiths’ producer John Porter.  An LP's worth of tracks mixed at London's Matrix Studios with the assistance of Billy Bragg producer Kenney Jones, were later deemed unsuitable for release.

Instead, the band retired to a Boston studio with engineer Gene Bodio to record the four-song EP Bingo Durango.  Courted by a number of American labels, Bingo Durango suffered the death of drummer Allan Shutter in a tragic accident.

Second incarnation 

The untimely death of Shutter sent the band into a tailspin only partially rectified by subsequent Live fanclub release and 1990's Bingo Durango, a collection of trenchant power pop that showcased a debt to The Beatles and XTC.  The later band would prove of increasing importance to the Bingo Durango discography.

Signed by Germany's Jarmusic, the home of such psychedelic performers as Martin Newell and future Broadway icon David Yazbek, the band released the assured Fool Romeo.  Housed in a collectible tin box, the EP showed Bingo Durango moving in a more experimental direction.  Two of the EP's four tracks were mixed by Steve Eigner, best known for his association with boy band 98 Degrees and Grammy Award winning R&B/hip hop artists Nelly and Mary J. Blige.

The band's 2000 swansong, Coming Down, included contributions from XTC guitarist/keyboardist Dave Gregory and cover art by American painter Greg Spalenka, who had also created the gatefold sleeve for the band's self-titled 1990 release.  Spalenka would gain subsequent acclaim for his conceptual art work on such feature films as The Ant Bully, The Golden Compass, and The Chronicles of Narnia: The Voyage of the Dawn Treader.

American pop rock music groups